Ralph Uno Hurtig (6 May 1932 – 23 November 2017) was a Swedish rower. He competed in the eights at the 1960 Summer Olympics, but failed to reach the final. His son Pär also became an Olympic rower.

References

1932 births
2017 deaths
Swedish male rowers
Olympic rowers of Sweden
Rowers at the 1960 Summer Olympics
Sportspeople from Gothenburg